Dana Island (also called Kargıncık Adası, Greek Latin Pithyussa) is a small Mediterranean island of Turkey.

Geography 

The passage between the main land and the island which is known as Kargıcak strait is a convenient passage for maritime traffic. The shape of the island is roughly rectangular with dimensions . Dana Adası is quite rocky and covered with maquis shrubland and yellow pine forest.

History 
Francis Beaufort, who surveyed the south coast of Turkey in 1811–1812, states that the island was called Manavat by the local people, and Provençal Island by sailors. He suggested that this derived from the name of one of the ranks of the Knights Hospitallers who occupied forts and islands along this coast.

According to recent research, there were many shipyards in Dana Island, probably dating to the Late Bronze Age (c. 1200 BC). Assistant professor Hakan Öniz says that the island was the largest proven shipyard in the ancient world. There are also some ruins at the southern coast of the main land facing the island.  Probably, these two settlements were the control posts dominating the two extremes of the strait.  The island was inhabited during the Roman and early Byzantine era. There are ruins of a few churches, graves, houses, aqueducts, a Roman bath and a harbour establishment at the north of the island.  According to some sources, French merchants also used the island as their port during Middle Ages.

See also 
Aphrodisias of Cilicia

References

External links 
 Dana Island

Islands of Turkey
Islands of Mersin Province
History of Mersin Province
Mediterranean islands